The anime from Bee Train studio was directed by Koichi Mashimo and had Minako Shiba as the character designer. The first season of the anime was aired on the Animax network in November 2004 and the second season in January 2006. Though adapted from a dating sims game, the anime pushed aside the main character of Erika, and she makes only brief appearances during the series. can / goo performed by the opening theme music for the first season, and the ending theme music, ; both were arranged by Koichiro Tokinori and composed by POM, with lyrics by Tapiko. alice nine. performed the opening theme music for the second season, and the ending theme music, .

Episode list

Meine Liebe

Meine Liebe ~Wieder~

DVD Volumes

References

Meine Liebe